Cheesefoot Head is a large natural amphitheatre (also known as Matterley Bowl) and beauty spot just outside Winchester, England. It is situated on the A272 road (South Downs Way). There are three bowl barrows on the site. The east, south and west walls of the amphitheatre are a  biological Site of Special Scientific Interest (SSSI).

The SSSI is a steeply sloping area of chalk grassland, which is grazed by cattle and rabbits. There is a full range of downland grass species, especially fescues and bents. Herbs include dwarf thistle and fragrant orchid.

During the Second World War boxing events were held here for the entertainment of American troops stationed locally, and prior to D-Day, General Eisenhower addressed those troops.

References

Geography of Hampshire
Tourist attractions in Hampshire